Thom Racina is an American television writer and novelist.

Personal
He hails from Kenosha, Wisconsin, went to school in Albuquerque and Chicago, where he got a MFA in Theatre Arts and Directing.

He is close friends with Sally Sussman Morina.

Positions held
Another World
Breakdown Writer: 1988
Script Writer: 1987

Dangerous Women
Head Writer: 1991

Days of Our Lives
Co-Head Writer: September 24, 1984 - November 18, 1986; 1994-1995, April 2004-December 2005 (with James E. Reilly)

Jam Bay
Head Writer: 1994

Family
Writer: 1978

Family Passions
Head Writer: 1993 - 1994

Friends and Lovers
Head Writer: 1994

General Hospital
Co-Head Writer: 1981 - 1984

Generations
Co-Head Writer: 1989 - 1991

Santa Barbara
Breakdown Writer: February 1992 - January 15, 1993
Co-Head Writer: 1991 - January 1992

Search for Tomorrow
Script Writer: 1980

The Young and the Restless (hired by Maria Arena Bell fired by Barbara Bloom)
Script Writer: August 1, 2008 - October 20, 2008

One Life to Live (hired by Prospect Park)
Head Writer: April 29 - August 19, 2013

Novels
Kojak: In San Francisco (1976)
The Great Los Angeles Blizzard (1977); became the basis for the "Ice Princess" story on the American soap opera General Hospital
Lifeguard (1978)
Blizzard (1979)
Nine to Five (1980)
Tomcat (1981)
Snow Angel (1996)
Hidden Agenda (1997)
Secret Weekend (1999)
The Madman's Diary (2001)
Never Forget (2002)
Deadly Games (2003)
Deep Freeze (2005)
Guardian Angel (with Terri Lee Ryan)

Awards and nominations
Daytime Emmy Awards NOMINATIONS 
(1985 & 1987; Best Writing; Days of Our Lives)
(1983 & 1984; Best Writing; General Hospital)

Writers Guild of America Award NOMINATIONS
(For 1992 season; Santa Barbara)
(For 1987 season; Days of Our Lives)

Head writing tenures

References

External links

American soap opera writers
Year of birth missing (living people)
Living people
American male television writers
Place of birth missing (living people)